Goaler may refer to:

Sports: a colloquial term for a Goaltender
Occupation: an archaic spelling for the Gaoler of a Prison